Khanjarabad may refer to:
 Khanjarabad, Hamadan
 Khanjarabad, Kermanshah